Jack Alvin Radford (November 4, 1929 – May 19, 2003) was a Canadian politician. He served in the Legislative Assembly of British Columbia from 1972 to 1975, as a NDP member for the constituency of Vancouver South. He died of cancer in 2003.

He played a season with the BC Lions when they were first organized and with the Edmonton Eskimos until knee injuries side-lined him. He began trap shooting in the 1950s and excelled in this sport; winning the BC Championship twice, as well as titles in the United States. He worked 20 years for Swift's Meats in Vancouver. He accepted a position with the International Woodworkers of America, then went on to become a representative for the Canadian Labour Congress.

References

1929 births
2003 deaths
BC Lions players
British Columbia New Democratic Party MLAs
Canadian conservationists
Canadian fishers
Canadian Labour Congress people
Canadian sportsperson-politicians
Trade unionists from British Columbia
Deaths from cancer in British Columbia
Edmonton Elks players
Members of the Executive Council of British Columbia
Players of Canadian football from British Columbia
Sportspeople from Nanaimo
Trap and double trap shooters
20th-century Canadian politicians
International Woodworkers of America people